Metachroma viticola is a species of leaf beetle. It is found along the Gulf Coast of the United States, particularly in Texas and Louisiana, and has also been reported from Mexico. The species name, Latin for "grape vine dwelling", was chosen because the species was reported as injurious to grapes.

References

Further reading

 

Eumolpinae
Articles created by Qbugbot
Beetles described in 1898
Beetles of North America